The name Samuel Shoemaker may refer to:

 Samuel Shoemaker (mayor) (1725-1800), Philadelphia mayor and British Loyalist
 Sam Shoemaker (1893-1963), Episcopalian priest